2013 Emperor's Cup Final was the 93rd final of the Emperor's Cup competition. The final was played at National Stadium in Tokyo on January 1, 2014. Yokohama F. Marinos won the championship.

Match details

See also
2013 Emperor's Cup

References

Emperor's Cup
2013 in Japanese football
Yokohama F. Marinos matches
Sanfrecce Hiroshima matches